Elinor DeWire (born August 3, 1953 in Frederick, Maryland) is an American author, freelance writer, editor, public speaker, educator, and blogger based in Connecticut.  DeWire writes both fiction and nonfiction, but is best known for her books about lighthouses and her work in lighthouse preservation and education.  She occasionally writes under the pseudonyms J.J. Scott, Jessica Scott, and Aline Matthews.

Early life and education

DeWire was born in Frederick, Maryland.

Career

DeWire began her career as an author by writing freelance stories for a Florida newspaper. After selling a story about lighthouses to Mobil's Compass Magazine, she wrote her first book, Guide to Florida Lighthouses, which was published by Pineapple Press in 1987 and remains in print in its third edition.

From 1991-2000 DeWire wrote two columns, "Lifelines" about the U.S. Lifesaving Service, and "Whale Oil and Wicks" about lighthouses, for the National Oceanic & Atmospheric Administration's Mariners Weather Log.

Since that time DeWire has authored some twenty books about lighthouses, including a series of illustrated, quick-reference e-books about lighthouses,  the "Itty-Bitty-Kitty Guides". She has also written early Victorian-era novels, plus four books and a number of articles about amateur astronomy and sky watching and an e-book about poultry.

She continues to contribute articles about lighthouses to magazines and newspapers, including columns titled "Shore Almanac," "Away from the Bay," "Kids on the Beam," and "Liquidized Lore."  She has been a regular contributor to Weatherwise Magazine, The Beachcomber, Lighthouse Digest", and The Keepers Log, journal of the U.S. Lighthouse Society.  She maintains a blog that focuses on lighthouses and related nautical topics, and has written fiction for several magazines.

DeWire is a public speaker about lighthouse history and lore, and she volunteers for several nonprofit groups devoted to lighthouse preservation and education. She is a member of the Board of Directors of the U.S. Lighthouse Society and chairs the Education Committee.</ref>

Awards
DeWire's books Lighthouses of the Mid-Atlantic Coast and Lighthouses of the South have won the Ben Franklin Book Award and the Coast Guard Book Award. She was awarded a short fiction prize in 1992 from the National League of American Pen Women. She is also the recipient of the Coast Guard Meritorious Public Service Award.

Books by Elinor DeWire 

Guide to Florida Lighthouses, Pineapple Press, 1987 
Journey through the Universe, Mystic Seaport Planetarium, 1989
Activities for Young Astronomers, Mystic Seaport Planetarium, 1990
Reach for the Sky, Mystic Seaport Planetarium, 1994
Guardians of the Lights: Stories of U.S. Lighthouse Keepers, Pineapple Press, 1995 & 2001 
The Lighthouse Activity Book, Sentinel Publications, 1995; E-Z Nature Books, 2007 
Lighthouse Victuals & Verse, Sentinel Publications, 1996
Sentries along the Shore, Sentinel Publications, 1997 
The Lighthouse Almanac, Sentinel Publications, 2000 
The Florida Night Sky, Pineapple Press, 2002  f
Lighthouses of the Mid-Atlantic Coast, Voyageur Press, 2002, 2011 
Lighthouses: Sentinels of the American Coast, Graphic Arts Center Publishing, 2003 
Lighthouses of the South, Voyageur Press, 2004 
Florida Lighthouses for Kids, Pineapple Press, 2004 
Field Guide to Lighthouses of the Pacific Coast, Voyageur Press, 2006 
The Lightkeepers' Menagerie: Stories of Animals at Lighthouses, Pineapple Press, 2007 
Field Guide to Lighthouses of the New England Coast, Voyageur Press, 2008 
Lighthouses of Greece, Pineapple Press, 2010 
The DeWire Guide to the Lighthouses of the Pacific Coast:California, Oregon and Washington, Paradise Cay Publications, 2010 
The DeWire Guide to the Lighthouses of Alaska, Hawai'i and U.S. Pacific Territories, 2012 
The Funky Chicken: Memories, Truth and Tribute, Cat in the Window Press, 2013  ASIN: BOOFAS4U6W
Itty-Bitty-Kitty Guide to the Lighthouses of Georgia, Cat in the Window Press, 2014 ASIN: BOOIVTC118
Itty-Bitty-Kitty Guide to the Lighthouses of New Hampshire, 2014 ASIN: BOOKQ4V3RE
Lighthouses Here & There, Cat in the Window Press, 2017 
Saving Lord M, Cat in the Window Press 
Dr. Bellamy's Broken Wife, Cat in the Window Press 
The Lord of Draig Nyth, Cat in the Window Pressa

References

External links 
 Pacific NW Lighthouses with Author Elinor DeWire. "the Journal of the San Juans", May 16, 2012. 
 Author Website
 Author Blog

1953 births
Living people